Antenne Brandenburg is a German, public radio station owned and operated by the Rundfunk Berlin-Brandenburg (RBB).

References

Rundfunk Berlin-Brandenburg
Ostdeutscher Rundfunk Brandenburg
Radio stations in Germany
Radio stations established in 1990
1990 establishments in Germany
Mass media in Potsdam